Lewis Rawlins (born 13 April 1990) is a Welsh rugby union player who plays for the Scarlets as a second row or a flanker.

Rawlins made his debut for the Scarlets in 2012 having previously played for their academy, Caerphilly RFC, Cross Keys RFC and Llanelli RFC. He was part of the squad that won the Pro 12 in the 2016–2017 season.

References

External links 
Scarlets Player Profile
ESPN Player Profile

Rugby union players from Caerphilly
Welsh rugby union players
Scarlets players
Living people
1990 births
Rugby union locks
Rugby union flankers